Alateng Heili (born December 14, 1991) is a Chinese mixed martial artist of Mongol ethnicity who competes in the Bantamweight division of the Ultimate Fighting Championship.

Background
Following his father's footsteps, Alateng started wrestling in school. Eventually he was spotted by a talent scout and was invited to join a team in Beijing, where he started to develop an interest in mixed martial arts.

Mixed martial arts career

Early career

Starting his career in 2013, Heili compiled a 12–7–1 record in various Asian organizations, most notably fighting in Road FC, which one of the fights being against future Rizin champ, Kai Asakura. Asakura won the fight after 29 seconds, hitting Heili with a short left hook, followed by a knee strike. Asakura suffered his first career loss to Je Hoon Moon during Road FC 39, losing by way of TKO.

Ultimate Fighting Championship
Alatang made his debut on August 31, 2019 at UFC Fight Night: Andrade vs. Zhang against Danaa Batgerel. He won the fight via unanimous decision. This fight earned him the Fight of the Night award.

Alateng faced Ryan Benoit on December 21, 2019 at UFC on ESPN+ 23. He won the fight via split decision.

Alateng was expected to face  Casey Kenney on September 27, 2020 at UFC 253. However, due to unknown reasons, it was moved to UFC on ESPN: Holm vs. Aldana on October 4, 2020. He lost the fight via unanimous decision.

Alateng faced Gustavo Lopez on September 18, 2021 at UFC Fight Night 192. The fight ended up with a draw.

Alateng faced Kevin Croom at UFC on ESPN 34 on April 16, 2022. He won the fight via technical knockout early into the first round.

Alateng faced Chad Anheilger on September 10, 2022, at UFC 279. He won the fight via unanimous decision.

Championships and accomplishments

Mixed martial arts
Ultimate Fighting Championship
Fight of the Night (One time)

Mixed martial arts record

|Win
|align=center|16–8–2
|Chad Anheliger
|Decision (unanimous)
|UFC 279
|
|align=center|3
|align=center|5:00
|Las Vegas, Nevada, United States
|
|-
|Win
|align=center|15–8–2
|Kevin Croom
|TKO (punches)
|UFC on ESPN: Luque vs. Muhammad 2 
|
|align=center|1
|align=center|0:47
|Las Vegas, Nevada, United States
|
|-
|Draw
|align=center|14–8–2
|Gustavo Lopez
|Draw (unanimous)
|UFC Fight Night: Smith vs. Spann 
|
|align=center|3
|align=center|5:00
|Las Vegas, Nevada, United States
||
|-
| Loss
| align=center| 14–8–1
| Casey Kenney
|Decision (unanimous)
|UFC on ESPN: Holm vs. Aldana
|
|align=center|3
|align=center|5:00
|Abu Dhabi, United Arab Emirates
|
|-
| Win
| align=center| 14–7–1
| Ryan Benoit
|Decision (split) 
|UFC Fight Night: Edgar vs. Korean Zombie
|
|align=center|3
|align=center|5:00
|Busan, South Korea 
|
|-
| Win
| align=center| 13–7–1
| Danaa Batgerel
|Decision (unanimous)
|UFC Fight Night: Andrade vs. Zhang
|
|align=center|3
|align=center|5:00
|Shenzhen, China
|
|-
| Win
| align=center| 12–7–1
| Jong Hyun Kwak
| TKO (punches)
| Road FC 47
| 
| align=center| 2
| align=center| 2:40
| Beijing, China
|
|-
| Win
| align=center|11–7–1
| Ik Hwan Jang
| TKO (punches)
| Road FC 46
| 
| align=center|1
| align=center|3:06
| Seoul, South Korea
|
|-
| Loss
| align=center|10–7–1
| Kai Asakura
|TKO (punches)
|Road FC 37
|
|align=center|1
|align=center|0:29
|Seoul, South Korea
|
|-
| Draw
| align=center|
| Nam Jin Jo
| Draw (unanimous)
| Road FC 34
| 
| align=center|3
| align=center|5:00
| Shijiazhuang, China
|
|-
| Win
| align=center|10–6
| Mu Song Choi
| Decision (unanimous)
|Road FC 31
| 
| align=center| 3
| align=center| 5:00
| Seoul, South Korea
|
|-
| Win
| align=center| 9–6
| Fumiya Sasaki
| TKO (punches)
| Road FC 30
| 
| align=center|1
| align=center|1:34
| Beijing, China
| 
|-
| Win
| align=center| 8–6
| Kana Hyatt
| Decision (unanimous)
| Kunlun Fight 38
|
| align=center| 3
| align=center| 5:00
|Pattaya, Thailand
| 
|-
| Win
| align=center| 7–6
| Min Seok Kwon
| Decision (split)
|Road FC 28
| 
| align=center| 3
| align=center| 5:00
| Seoul, South Korea
| 
|-
| Win
| align=center| 6–6
| Emil Abbasov
| Decision (unanimous)
| WLF E.P.I.C. 1
| 
| align=center| 3
| align=center| 5:00
| Zhengzhou, China
| 
|-
| Win
| align=center| 5–6
| Jessie Rafols
| Submission (guillotine choke)
| Kunlun Fight 31
| 
| align=center| 2
| align=center| N/A
| Bangkok, Thailand
| 
|-
| Loss
| align=center| 4–6
| Nam Jin Jo
| Decision (unanimous)
| WBK 4
| 
| align=center| 3
| align=center| 5:00
| Ningbo, China
|
|-
| Win
| align=center| 4–5
| Stephen Langdown
| TKO (punches and soccer kicks)
| One Championship 27: Warrior's Quest
| 
| align=center| 2
| align=center| 0:51
| Kallang, Singapore
|
|-
| Loss
| align=center| 3–5
| Altynbek Bazhimov
| Submission (armbar)
| Kunlun Fight: Cage Series 2
| 
| align=center| 1
| align=center| 2:53
| Almaty, Kazakhstan
| 
|-
| Loss
| align=center| 3–4
| Zhikang Zhao
| Decision (unanimous)
|Chinese Kung Fu Championships
|
|align=center|3
|align=center|3:00
|Qian'an, China
|
|-
| Loss
| align=center| 3–3
| Denis Purić
|TKO (punches)
|Kunlun Fight 13
|
|align=center|2
|align=center|2:05
|Hohhot, China
|
|-
| Win
| align=center| 3–2
| Chao Huang
| Submission (rear-naked choke)
|Chinese Kung Fu Championships
| 
| align=center| 2
| align=center| 1:44
| Qian'an, China
|
|-
| Loss
| align=center|2–2
| Baasankhuu Damnlanpurev
| TKO (punches)
| Ranik Ultimate Fighting Federation 13
| 
| align=center|2
| align=center|2:03
| Shanghai, China
|
|-
| Win
| align=center|2–1
| Tom Ni
| Submission (rear-naked choke)
| Ranik Ultimate Fighting Federation 12
| 
| align=center|1
| align=center|N/A
| Shanghai, China
|
|-
| Loss
| align=center|1–1
| Song Yadong
| Decision (unanimous)
| Ranik Ultimate Fighting Federation 11
| 
| align=center|3
| align=center|5:00
| Shanghai, China
|
|-
| Win
| align=center| 1–0
| Woong Hee Lee
| Decision (unanimous)
| Real Fight MMA Championship 3
| 
| align=center| 2
| align=center| 5:00
| Beijing, China
|

See also 
 List of current UFC fighters
 List of male mixed martial artists

References

External links 
  
 

Chinese male mixed martial artists
1991 births
Living people
People from Alxa League
Sportspeople from Inner Mongolia
Chinese people of Mongolian descent
Bantamweight mixed martial artists
Flyweight mixed martial artists
Mixed martial artists utilizing freestyle wrestling
Ultimate Fighting Championship male fighters
Chinese male sport wrestlers